The Death Ship is a 1959 West German adventure film directed by Georg Tressler and starring Horst Buchholz, Mario Adorf, Helmut Schmid, and Elke Sommer. The film is based on the book of the same name by B. Traven, author of The Treasure of Sierra Madre, and was filmed on location in Spain. The film's sets were designed by the art directors Emil Hasler and Walter Kutz.

Plot
A group of outcast men drift around the world, never settling down or being accepted. They encounter various adventures around the globe, including being forced to work on a decrepit ship.

Cast
 Horst Buchholz as Amerikanischer Seeman
 Mario Adorf as Lawski - Polnischer Kohlenschlepper
 Elke Sommer as Mylene - ein Französisches Mädchen
 Helmut Schmid as Martin - Heizer auf der Yorikke
 Alf Marholm as Kapitän der Yorikke
 Werner Buttler as Dils - 1. Ingenieu
 Dieter von Keil as Statter - 1. Offizier
 Panos Papadopulos as Popoff - Bulgarischer Dockarbeiter
 Edgar O. Faiss as 	Bootsmann auf der Yorikke
 Günter Meisner as Paul - Trimmer auf der Yorikke
 Alfred Balthoff as Ballard
 Albert Bessler as US-Konsul
 Karl Lieffen as Belgischer Kripobeamter
 Marielouise Nagel as 	Blonde Prostituierte
 Claudia Gerstäcker as Shaba

References

External links
 

West German films
1950s German-language films
German adventure drama films
1950s adventure drama films
Films directed by Georg Tressler
Films based on German novels
Films based on works by B. Traven
Films set on ships
Seafaring films
Films shot in Almería
UFA GmbH films
1959 drama films
1950s German films